Miriam Sheehan (born 20 September 2004) is a Puerto Rican swimmer. She competed in the 2020 Summer Olympics, held July–August 2021 in Tokyo.

References

2004 births
Living people
Sportspeople from San Juan, Puerto Rico
Sportspeople from Phoenix, Arizona
Swimmers at the 2020 Summer Olympics
Puerto Rican female swimmers
Olympic swimmers of Puerto Rico